The Department of Chemistry is the chemistry department of the University of Oxford, England, which is part of the university's Mathematical, Physical and Life Sciences Division

Overview
The department has several laboratories in the Science Area, Oxford:

Mansfield Road
In Mansfield Road

 Chemical Biology Laboratory
 Chemistry Research Laboratory

South Parks Road
In South Parks Road

 Inorganic Chemistry Laboratory (ICL)
 Physical and Theoretical Chemistry Laboratory (PTCL)
 Dyson Perrins Laboratory (DP) – research laboratory closed

History
Chemistry has a long history at Oxford.  The early pioneer of chemistry Robert Boyle and his assistant Robert Hooke began working in Oxford in the mid-seventeenth century.  A chemistry laboratory was built in the basement of the Old Ashmolean Building in 1683, which was used until 1860. Chemical research was also conducted in laboratories set up in individual colleges – Christ Church, Oxford (1767), Magdalen College, Oxford (Daubeny Laboratory, 1848), Balliol College, Oxford (1853, later joined with Trinity College, Oxford to become the Balliol-Trinity Laboratories), Queen's College, Oxford (1900), and Jesus College, Oxford (1907).

Chemistry was first recognized as a separate discipline at Oxford with the building of a laboratory attached to the Oxford University Museum of Natural History, opening in 1860. The laboratory is a small octagonal structure to the right of the museum, built in stone in the Victorian Gothic style. The design was based on the Abbot's Kitchen at Glastonbury and it adopted the same name despite being a laboratory. The building was one of the first ever purpose-built chemical laboratories anywhere and was extended in 1878. The Abbot's Kitchen in Oxford was expanded considerably in 1957 to become the main Inorganic Chemistry Laboratory (ICL). The Dyson Perrins Laboratory opened in 1916 and was the centre of the Department of Organic Chemistry until 2003 when it was replaced by the Chemistry Research Laboratory. The Physical Chemistry Laboratory replaced the Balliol-Trinity Laboratories in 1941, and its east wing completed in 1959. The physical and theoretical chemistry departments merged in 1994 and the Physical and Theoretical Chemistry Laboratory became its base in 1995.

A number of professors and scientists who worked in the department had won the Nobel Prize; they include Frederick Soddy for his work on radioactivity with Ernest Rutherford, Cyril Norman Hinshelwood for his work on chemical kinetics, and Dorothy Hodgkin on crystallography. Among the notable achievements by professors in the department are the development of the Periodic Table by William Odling, work on solid state chemistry by John Stuart Anderson and John B. Goodenough (winner of the 2019 Nobel Prize in Chemistry), and bioinorganic chemistry by Robert Williams.

Notable staff and alumni

Heads of department have included:
 Mark Brouard
 Timothy Softley FRS 2011 to 2015
 Stephen G. Davies 2006-2011
 Graham Richards FRS 1997 to 2006

Current academics in the Department of Chemistry include:
 Ed Anderson
 Harry Anderson FRS
 Fraser Armstrong FRS
 Hagan Bayley FRS
 Tom Brown FRSE
 David Clary FRS
 Richard G. Compton
 William I. F. David FRS
 Ben G. Davis FRS
 Andrew Goodwin
 Veronique Gouverneur FRS
 David Hodgson
 Peter J. Hore
 Madhavi Krishnan
 Iain McCulloch FRS
 John McGrady
 Susan Perkin
 Carol Robinson FRS
 Christopher Schofield FRS
 Christiane Timmel
 Claire Vallance
 Charlotte Williams FRS

Other notable staff and alumni include:
 John Albery FRS
 Peter Atkins
 Jack Baldwin FRS
 Ronnie Bell FRS
 Arthur Birch FRS
 Edmund Bowen FRS
 Charles Coulson FRS
 John Cornforth FRS
 Dorothy Crowfoot Hodgkin FRS
 Katherine Holt, Professor at University College London
 Frederick Dainton FRS
 John B. Goodenough ForMemRS
 Malcolm Green FRS
 Andrew Hamilton FRS
 Rita Harradence
 Cyril Hinshelwood FRS
 Ewart Jones FRS
 Jeremy Knowles FRS
 Jack Linnett FRS
 Rex Richards FRS
 Robert Robinson FRS
 John Rowlinson FRS
 John Sutherland FRS
 Margaret Thatcher FRS
 Robert K. Thomas FRS
 Harold Thompson FRS
 R. J. P. Williams FRS

References

1860 establishments in England
Chemistry
Oxford